Sola Sobowale  (born 26 December 1963) is a Nigerian film actress, screenwriter, film director and film producer. Sola Sobowale had her big break in 2001, in the premiere of Nigeria's popular television drama series Super Story: Oh Father, Oh Daughter.

Career
Before shooting into stardom,  Sola Sobowale had roles in The Village Headmaster, Mirror in the Sun, and the Yoruba film, Asewo To Re Mecca. Sola Sobowale joined acting through numerous roles in movies produced by Awada Kerikeri Group under the leadership of Adebayo Salami. Over the years, Sola Sobowale had scripted, co-scripted, directed and produced several Nigerian films.
Sola scripted, produced and directed, Ohun Oko Somida, a 2010 Nigerian film that stars Adebayo Salami. Sobowale featured in Dangerous Twins, a 2004 Nigerian drama film produced by Tade Ogidan, written and directed by Niji Akanni. Sola Sobowale is also featured in Family on Fire produced and directed by Tade Ogidan.

Sola Sobowale revealed on her Instagram page in July 2022, that she had been cast in her first Bollywood role for the upcoming film by film director Hamisha Daryani Ahuja.

Personal life
Sola Sobowale is married and has four children. Sola Sobowale was chosen to be the brand ambassador for Mouka mattress company's Wellbeing range.

Awards 
in 2019, Sola Sobowale received the African Movie Academy Awards (AMAA) for Best Actress in a Leading Role for her role in the 2018 Nigerian film: King of Boys.

Selected filmography

Actor
Asewo To Re Mecca (1992)
Diamond Ring  (1998)
Super Story: Oh Father, Oh Daughter (2001).
Outkast (2001).
Ayomida (2003)
Ayomida 2 (2003)
Dangerous Twins (2004)
Disoriented Generation (2009)
Ohun Oko Somida (2010)
Family on Fire (2011)
The Wedding Party (2016)
Hustle (2016-2018)
Christmas Is Coming (2017)
The Wedding Party 2 (2017)
King of Boys (2018)
Crazy People (2018)
The Men's Club (2018 - 2020)
Wives on Strike: The Revolution (2019)
Gold Statue (2019)
Shadow Parties (2020)
In Case of Incasity (2020)
King of Boys: The Return of the King (2021)
Aníkúlápó (2022)

Producer
Ayomida (2003)
Ayomida 2 (2003)
Ohun Oko Somida (2010)

Notable Work
Diamond Ring
Dangerous Twins
The Wedding Party
The Wedding Party 2
Christmas is Coming
Hustle
King of Boys
Gold Statue
King of Boys 2: Return of the King

See also
 List of Nigerian film producers
List of Yoruba people

References

Living people
Nigerian film producers
Yoruba actresses
Actresses in Yoruba cinema
20th-century Nigerian actresses
21st-century Nigerian actresses
Actresses from Ondo State
1963 births
Nigerian film directors
Nigerian screenwriters
Nigerian television actresses
Nigerian media personalities